Bar Kappara was a rabbi of the late 2nd  and early 3rd century CE, during the period between the tannaim and amoraim. He was active in Caesarea in the Land of Israel, from around 180 to 220 CE. His name, meaning "Son of Kapparah", was taken from his father, Eleazar ha-Kappar. He was one of the students of R' Judah haNasi, and an Amora of the first generation.

He was a talented poet and storyteller, and it is said that at the wedding feast of Simeon, the son of Rebbi, he kept the guests captivated with fables until their food got cold.  However, his satirical wit (he once ridiculed the son-in-law of Rebbi by telling him to ask Rebbi a riddle that really was an insulting criticism of Rebbi's household), lost him the chance to be ordained.

Name
His full name was Eleazar (there seems to be no ground for the form "Eliezer") ben Eleazar ha-Kappar. This is the form appearing in the tannaite sources, Tosefta and Sifre; the usual Talmudic form, "Bar Kappara," and the frequent appellation, "Eleazar ha-Kappar Berabbi", are abbreviations of this. According to a later source, his given name was Shimon rather than Eleazar.

In Kohelet Rabbah, the given name of Bar Kapparah is Abba.

Biography

Bar Kappara was a pupil of Judah haNasi. His teachers seem to also include R. Nathan the Babylonian and R. Jeremiah ben Eleazar (probably identical with the Jeremiah mentioned in the Mekhilta and Sifre).

Conflict with Judah haNasi

Bar Kappara and R' Judah haNasi seem to have been opposites in personality, with Judah haNasi's princely grandeur contrasting with Bar Kappara's poetic abandon and vivacious attitude. Perhaps as a result, the two are recorded as coming in conflict in various ways. Judah initially refused to invite Bar Kappara to the wedding of Judah's son Shimon, and after Judah changed his mind, Bar Kappara went on to mock Judah at the wedding. According to another source, Bar Kappara took revenge in a different manner:  At the feast which Judah subsequently gave in Bar Kappara's honor, the latter told a vast number of fox fables (300, it is reported) and the guests left the food untouched in order to listen to him.

On another occasion, Bar Kappara belittled Judah in the presence of Judah's son Simon. Judah, upon hearing of this from his son, informed Bar Kappara of his firm resolve never to grant him ordination. The Jerusalem Talmud tells a slightly different version of this story, where Bar Kappara prompted Judah's ignorant son-in-law Ben Elasah to ask Judah the following riddle:
"High from Heaven her eye looks down; Constant strife excites her frown; Winged beings shun her sight; She puts youth to instant flight; The aged, too, her aspect scout; Oh! oh! the fugitive cries out. And by her snares whoever is lured, Shall never more from sin be cured!"
When Judah turned round after hearing the riddle, he discovered Bar Kappara smiling, and exclaimed: "I do not recognize you, old one!" (meaning also, "I do not recognize you as an elder, a sage!"). Bar Kappara understood from this that he would never receive ordination.

What the riddle really signifies is not known, despite many attempts to explain it. The most probable view is Abraham Krochmal's, that Bar Kappara intended it as a criticism of Judah's unrelenting severity toward young and old. The verse is notable as an example of Hebrew poetry in Talmudic times; its few lines may be the sole testimony to the activity of the Jews of that time in secular poetry. Its language is classic, but not slavishly so; forceful and pure, yet easy and flowing. Curiously, the one other preserved example of Bar Kappara's poetry is the eloquent words in which he proclaimed Judah haNasi's death to the assembled people of Sepphoris: "Brethren of the house of Jedaiah [an epithet of the inhabitants of Sepphoris], listen to me! Mortals and angels have long been wrestling for the possession of the holy tablets of the Law; the angels have conquered. They have captured the tablets". Bar Kappara's presence in Sepphoris suggests that, despite Judah's attitude toward him, he appreciated his great obligations to his teacher; and that his grief for Judah's death was sincere.

Activity in Caesarea
His conflicts with Judah haNasi induced him to leave the Galilee for Caesarea. The academy he set up there came to be a serious rival of Judah haNasi's. Among the most important of its scholars were Hoshayah, "the father of the Mishnah", and Joshua ben Levi, the distinguished aggadist, who to a large extent transmitted Bar Kappara's aggadic teachings. The greatest admirers of Judah haNasi and supporters of Judah's patriarchial house, Hanina bar Hama and Johanan ben Nappaha, could not refrain from acknowledging Bar Kappara's greatness.

It is related of him that once while walking on the mole of Caesarea and seeing a Roman that had escaped from shipwreck in utter destitution, he took him to his house and provided him with clothing and all necessaries, including money. Later this castaway became proconsul of Caesarea, and occasion soon offered itself to show his gratitude to his rescuer, when Jews involved in a political disturbance were arrested, and he released them on Bar Kappara's intervention.

Upon Bar Kappara's death, Rabbi Yohanan went to Parod (פרוד or פארוד) in order to question people who may have remembered sayings that were passed down in the name of Bar Kappara. Nothing further is known of this place; Bacher suggests it may have been a suburb of Caesarea.

Teachings
Bar Kappara was particularly known to the amoraim as the author of a compilation called the Mishnah of Bar Kappara. This work has not been preserved, and probably at the final redaction of the Talmud it was no longer extant. In fact, it is questionable whether the work ever reached Babylonia, as the one passage in the Bavli referring to it originated with Shimon ben Lakish, a Yerushalmi. In any case, the numerous passages from his Mishnah that found their way into the Talmud suffice for judgment upon its character. Menachem Meiri quite correctly designates it as a supplement to the Mishnah of Judah haNasi, intended chiefly to explain it, and, on rare occasions, to give differing opinions (see Baraita). It also presented variants to Judah haNasi's Mishnah, and later on became occasionally so interwoven in the text of the latter that doubt arose whether the Mishnah in question belonged to the one or to the other. The Mishnah of Bar Kappara was also used by the redactor of the Tosefta, who derived many decisions from it. Is. Halevy, however, denies the existence of Bar Kappara's Mishnah, without sufficient reason.

Bar Kappara ascribed great value to the study of astronomy: "He who can calculate the solstices and movements of the planets and fails to pay attention to these things, to him may be applied the verse (Isaiah 5:12) 'They regard not the works of the Lord, nor the operation of his hands". This statement is particularly striking when compared to his opinion about the obligation to study Torah: that a Jew who reads just two portions from the Torah daily—one in the morning and one in the evening—fulfills the commandment to meditate in God's law by day and night. Bar Kappara appreciated not only natural science, but also the Greek love of the beautiful. He explained Genesis 9:27 as follows: "The words of the Torah should be recited in the speech of Japheth (i.e. Greek) in the tents of Shem (i.e. in the synagogues and schools)".

Bar Kappara's respect for the exact sciences was equaled by his aversion for metaphysical speculation, which in his time flourished among Jews and Christians in the form of gnosis. Referring to Deuteronomy 4:32 ("Ask now of the past days, which were before you, since the day that God created man on the earth") Bar Kappara says, "Seek to know only of those days that followed Creation; but seek not to know what went before".

The Jerusalem Talmud contains a prayer he wrote and included in the repetition of the 18th section of Thanksgiving in the Amidah.

The sayings of Bar Kappara regarding the incense offering are recited thrice daily by Sephardi Jews (before and after Shacharit, and before Mincha); twice daily by Hasidic Jews (before Shacharit, and before Mincha); and once daily by Ashkenazi Jews (before Shacharit).

Quotes 
 Which is a brief passage upon which all fundamentals of the Torah are dependent? "In all your ways acknowledge Him, and He will direct your paths" (Proverbs 3:6).
 A man should always teach his son a clean and easy profession.

References

 Encyclopaedia Judaica, 1972, Keter Publishing House, Jerusalem, Israel.
 Sefer Ha-Aggadah (Book of Legends), 1992, Schocken, New York.

Jewish Encyclopedia bibliography
 Bacher, Agada der Tannaiten, ii. 503–520 (for other passages in the same, see the Index);
 Brüll, Mebo ha-Mishnah, i. 244, 289–292;
 Frankel, Darke ha-Mishnah, p. 313;
 idem, Mebo, 20a et seq., 71a;
 Grätz, Gesch. der Juden, 4th ed., iv. 198, 199, 211;
 Hamburger, Supplement to R. B. T. pp. 36–38;
 Kohan, in Ha-Asif, iii. 330–333 (Kohan here first pointed out the identity of Bar Kappara with Eleazar ben Eleazar ha-Ḳappar);
 Abraham Krochmal, in He-Ḥaluẓ, ii. 84;
 Rapoport, in Literaturblatt des Orients, i. 38, 39;
 Reifmann, Pesher Dabar;
 Weiss, Dor Dor we-Dorshaw, ii. 191, 219.

2nd-century births
3rd-century deaths
2nd-century rabbis
3rd-century rabbis
Mishnah rabbis
Talmud rabbis of the Land of Israel